Deep Blue is a 2003 nature documentary film that is a theatrical version of the 2001 BBC nature documentary series The Blue Planet. Alastair Fothergill and Andy Byatt are credited as directors, and six cinematographers are also credited.

Production

Deep Blue is a theatrical version of the 2001 BBC nature documentary series The Blue Planet. BBC Worldwide and Germany's Greenlight Media co-produced the film. Alastair Fothergill and Andy Byatt are credited as directors, and six cinematographers were also credited: Doug Allan, Mike deGruy, Peter Scoones, Simon King, Rick Rosenthal, and Bob Cranston. The idea for Deep Blue developed from when a shorter version of The Blue Planet was cut for The Proms in 2002 and for which George Fenton composed a score. When BBC Worldwide partnered with Greenlight Media and the latter helped raise money for the film, the filmmakers reviewed over 70,000 hours of raw footage from The Blue Planet. Ultimately, a quarter of Deep Blue consisted of footage not shown in The Blue Planet. Producer Sophokles Tasioulis said, "There's not a single cut in the movie that's the same as the TV series." The film contains only 15 lines of narrative. Filmmakers enlisted Fenton to compose the film's score, which was performed by the Berlin Philharmonic in their cinematic debut. Voiceovers were also recorded for different countries. Production of the theatrical version cost , while marketing and distribution cost an additional .

Release
Variety reported, "'Deep Blue' world preemed at San Sebastian to applause Saturday."

Deep Blue was the first theatrical release from BBC Worldwide. The film "performed well" in theaters in Europe. In Germany, it became the highest-grossing documentary film to date. In Japan, it broke records at the box office. The documentary was released on DVD before Christmas 2004. Over 480,000 units were sold in the United Kingdom, France, Germany, and Switzerland. In Japan, it sold over 110,000 copies on the first day and became the first documentary to rank first on Japan's DVD charts.

Miramax Films acquired rights in December 2003 to distribute Deep Blue in North America. Variety called the acquisition "a rare foray for the distrib into nonfiction films". It gave the film a limited release in June 2005.

Critical reception

The film review website Metacritic reported that among a sample of 17 critics from the United States, 11 gave Deep Blue a positive review and 6 gave it a mixed review. The website gave the film an overall score of 71 out of 100. Laura Kern of The New York Times called Deep Blue, a re-cut of The Blue Planet, "a more visual and less informative re-assemblage of the mounds of footage shot for the show, is alternately mind-blowing and mind-numbing". Kern commended footage of deep-sea creatures as "so exotic they would be the envy of any science-fiction film". The critic concluded, "The experience of 'Deep Blue' is hardly enlightening. In the end, a sliver of knowledge may be gained, or environmental concerns only briefly alluded to might be pondered, but mostly what remains are pretty pictures that quickly fade into oblivion."

References

External links

2003 films
2003 documentary films
Documentary films about nature
Films scored by George Fenton
Films directed by Andy Byatt
Films directed by Alastair Fothergill
2000s English-language films